On 6 August 1977, during the Rhodesian Bush War, a Woolworths store in Salisbury, Rhodesia (today Harare, Zimbabwe) was bombed by nationalist guerillas. Eleven civilians were killed and 76 were injured. Of those killed, eight were black Rhodesians, including two pregnant women and a young boy, and three were whites, members of a single family, Gillian and Donald Mayor and their mother. Mr Mayor and another daughter, Wendy, were seated in a car outside when the bomb went off.

It detonated shortly before the crowded store was to close at noon that Saturday. The perpetrators, two teachers, afterwards escaped to Mozambique.

Ian Smith, the Rhodesian Prime Minister, expressed horror at the bombing. "Those who have perpetrated this barbarous outrage can hardly be described as human," he said. Rhodesian black nationalist leaders Bishop Abel Muzorewa and the Reverend Ndabaningi Sithole also condemned the attack.

References

Bibliography

External links
Newsreport on attack on YouTube

Explosions in 1977
1977 in Rhodesia
History of Rhodesia
Mass murder in 1977
Rhodesian Bush War
Terrorism in Rhodesia
Massacres in Rhodesia
Communist terrorism
August 1977 events in Africa
20th century in Harare
Improvised explosive device bombings in Africa
Terrorist incidents in Zimbabwe
Terrorist incidents in Africa in 1977